Thomas James Harrington (born 6 October 1992) is a former English professional footballer who played as a defender.

Career statistics

Club

Notes

References

Living people
1992 births
English footballers
Association football defenders
Hong Kong Premier League players
Hong Kong FC players
English expatriate footballers
English expatriate sportspeople in Hong Kong
Expatriate footballers in Hong Kong